Lori Bowden (born June 13, 1967 in Fergus, Ontario) is a professional triathlete from Canada.

Bowden competes at the Ironman distance in the sport, her first win coming at Ironman Canada in Penticton in 1997.  She went on to record a number of other victories and won the Ironman Triathlon World Championships in Kailua-Kona, Hawaii in 1999 and 2003.

External links

1967 births
Living people
Canadian female triathletes
Duathletes
Ironman world champions
People from Centre Wellington
Triathlon people from Ontario